Brad Hepi (born February 11, 1972) is a New Zealand rugby league player who played professionally in both England and Australia.

Early years
Hepi attended Kelston Boys' High School and captained their first XV rugby union team.

Playing career
Hepi played in the 1986 and 1988 Pacific Cups for the New Zealand Māori.

In 1989 he moved to England, joining Carlisle RLFC. He then had a very successful spell with Workington Town which saw the club promoted from the third division to the first in two seasons, winning the Divisional Premiership against London Broncos along the way. Town initially struggled in the top flight and found themselves at the bottom of the league at Christmas 1994. But an early-January 36-10 win over Halifax, with Hepi man of the match, was the turning point. From there, they rose from 16th to 9th – a position which saw them qualify for the first Super League season in 1996.

At the end of the 1994-95 campaign, Hepi moved to Australia, signing with the Illawarra Steelers for their 1996 season. He returned to Derwent Park in 1997, but couldn't prevent Town's relegation to the professional game's bottom tier. Nevertheless, for what he did in his first spell at the club, Hepi is fondly remembered in Workington.

In 1998 he played for Hull F.C. in Super League III. Hepi then had spells with the Castleford Tigers (Heritage № 762) (1999 and 2001), Featherstone Rovers (2000), Salford City Reds (2000) and Doncaster (2001) before retiring. Although retired a few years Hepi has made a few cameo appearances for the Gloucestershire All Golds in the 2013 season.

Later years
Hepi was appointed coach of the Gloucestershire All-Golds for the 2013 season. He coached the side in their first season of the Kingstone Press Championship 1 league where they reached bottom place. In the 2014 kingstonpress championship one season he saw the side into the first seven-game before stepping down from the position, stating he had taken the side as far as he could.

His son, Tyla Hepi, has played in the Auckland Rugby League competition for the Point Chevalier Pirates. He also played under his father at the Gloucestershire All-Golds whilst on loan from Hull Kingston Rovers.

References

1968 births
Living people
Carlisle RLFC players
Castleford Tigers players
Doncaster R.L.F.C. players
Featherstone Rovers players
Glenora Bears players
Gloucestershire All Golds coaches
Gloucestershire All Golds players
Hull F.C. players
Illawarra Steelers players
New Zealand expatriate sportspeople in England
New Zealand Māori rugby league players
New Zealand Māori rugby league team players
New Zealand rugby league coaches
New Zealand rugby league players
People educated at Kelston Boys' High School
Place of birth missing (living people)
Rugby league hookers
Salford Red Devils players
Workington Town players
Rugby articles needing expert attention